Læsø ("Isle of Hlér") is the largest island in the North Sea bay of Kattegat, and is located  off the northeast coast of the Jutland Peninsula, the Danish mainland. Læsø is also the name of the municipality (Danish, kommune) on that island. The island is a location mentioned in several instances in Old Norse sources detailing Norse mythology.

Name and Norse mythology

The modern Danish form of the island's name, læsø, developed from Old Norse Hlésey, meaning 'Hlér's island'. Hlér (Old Norse 'sea'), also known as Ægir (also Old Norse 'sea'), is a jötunn and personification of the sea in Norse mythology whose nine daughters personify waves. Similarly, the Danish city of Lejre may also derive from Hlér.

In the Poetic Edda poem Hárbarðsljóð, the god Thor comments that it was on Hlésey that he was attacked by (and so fought) "berserk women" or "brides of berserks" who had bewitched all of the men on the island. Thor details that, upon beaching his ship, the women battered it, threatened him with iron clubs and chased his servant, Þjálfi:

These "women" are personified waves and/or jötnar. The island is also a setting in the poems Helgakviða Hundingsbana II and Oddrúnargrátr, the saga Örvar-Odds saga, in two skaldic kennings, and the aforementioned (see etymology section above) Prose Edda book Skáldskaparmál.

The Municipality of Læsø

The municipality is in Region Nordjylland in northern Denmark. January 2022. The population has been steadily declining, and according to Danmarks Statistik (Statistikbanken.dk) was: 

Its mayor is Karsten Nielsen as of 2021. He is a member of the Venstre political party.

The main town and the site of its municipal council is Byrum.

Because Læsø is an island and lies in the Kattegat, its neighboring municipality, Frederikshavn on the Jutland peninsula, is separated by water, the Læsø Rende, from the island municipality.

Ferry service connects Frederikshavn on the Jutland peninsula to the municipality at the town of Vesterø Havn while Østerby Havn is the island's fishing harbour.

Læsø Municipality was not merged with any adjacent municipality under the municipal reform of 2007, as it agreed to enter into a "municipal cooperation agreement" with Frederikshavn Municipality.

Municipal council
Læsø's municipal council consists of 9 members, elected every four years.

Below are the municipal councils elected since the Municipal Reform of 2007.

Nature and protections
Læsø has an outstanding botanical interest. The nature-types on and around Læsø includes open water, extensive mudflats, sand banks, heathland, islets and areas of arable land. It houses Denmark's largest tidal saltmarsh outside the Wadden Sea but the decline in grazing animals has led to a gradual vegetational succession. Invasive species are colonizing the site, especially Japanese Rose, and scrub clearance has been implemented to re-establish the former pastures open heathland. Seals like the Harbor seal are breeding around Læsø and the whole area is an internationally important area for wintering, molting and staging waterbirds. Therefore, a Ramsar protection was put into force in 1977 (number 149) and today it encompass 66,548 ha.

Climate, industry, and wildlife
Together with Anholt, Læsø belongs to the Danish "desert belt"; during the summer months there is so little rain that streams and ponds partly dry up.

In the Middle Ages, the island was known for its salt industry. The ground water can reach over 15 percent salt, and this was naturally concentrated in flat salt meadows during the hot dry summers. The final concentration, carried out in hundreds of salt kilns, consumed large amounts of wood. Eventually the island became deforested, sandstorms buried villages, and salt extraction was banned. Since the end of the 1980s it has been resumed on a small scale as an archaeological experiment and a tourist attraction.

Læsø is home to unique styles of Danish traditional music. Most of it is not played any more but has been preserved through intense documentation and research in the 1980s and 1990s.

The HVDC powerline Kontiskan crosses Læsø as overhead line. On Læsø, there is also a 160 metres tall radio relay mast.

In 1993 a conservation area was established for the A. m. mellifera nicknamed the Brown Bee of Læsø, where it became illegal according to Danish Law to keep and import any other type of bee other than Apis mellifera mellifera, this was met with protests and a legal battle lasting eight years from other beekeepers of A. m. ligustica, A. m. carnica and Buckfast bees as they did not "want to become a custodian of poor bees", they also stated that A. m. mellifera was "unproductive" and "not worthy of protection". They lost their case in 2001, and negotiations between A. m. mellifera beekeepers and non-A. m. mellifera beekeepers were concluded in 2004, splitting the island in two between them, ending a "history of sabotage of bees" on the island. The A. m. mellifera supporters claimed that they had "introduced apartheid on Læsø for the bees".

Notable residents
 Gustav S. Christensen (1929 in Læsø – 2007 in Canada) an academic mathematician and engineer. 
 Mogens Bay Esbensen  (born 1930) a prominent Danish born chef and author has lived there since 1992  
 Per Kirkeby (1938–2018) a Danish painter, poet, film maker and sculptor owned a house and studio on the island

Gallery

See also
 Johns Rock
 List of islands of Denmark

Notes

References

 Bellows, Henry Adams (Trans.) (1923). The Poetic Edda. New York: The American-Scandinavian Foundation.
 Faulkes, Anthony (Trans.) (1995). Edda. Everyman. 
 McKinnell, John (2005). Meeting the Other in Norse Myth in Legends. D.S. Brewer. 

 Thorpe, Benjamin (Trans.) (1907). The Elder Edda of Saemund Sigfusson. Norrœna Society.

External links

 Official website
 Municipal statistics: NetBorger Kommunefakta, delivered from KMD aka Kommunedata (Municipal Data)
 Municipal mergers and neighbors: Eniro new municipalities map

 
Municipalities of the North Jutland Region
Municipalities of Denmark
Islands of Denmark
Danish islands in Kattegat
Ramsar sites in Denmark